Montana Highway 83 (MT 83) is a  north–south state highway in Flathead, Lake, and Missoula counties in Montana, United States, that connects Montana Highway 200 (MT 200) in Clearwater (east of Missoula) with Montana Highway 35 (MT 35) on north edge of Bigfork.

Route description
The region is sparsely settled, with small communities economically dependent on a mixture of logging and tourism. The largest communities along the route are Seeley Lake, Condon and Swan Lake.

MT 83 passes through mostly forest landscape, and wildlife crossings should be expected at all times.  Elk herds crossing near Clearwater Junction can be hard to see at night.

History
Most of today's MT 83 has existed since at least 1934, originally designated as part of MT 31 as depicted on the 1935 state map.

From 1960 until 1977, the southerly  of MT 83 were a part of Secondary Highway 209 (S-209), and the northernmost  were designated as S-326.

Since 1978, a small segment of S-209 survives under its original designation, between Bigfork and a junction with the current MT 83 near Ferndale.  (The S-326 designation was later reused on an unrelated highway in southeastern Carter County, Montana.)

Major intersections

See also

 List of state highways in Montana

References

External links

083
Transportation in Flathead County, Montana
Transportation in Lake County, Montana
Transportation in Missoula County, Montana